Jérémie Makiese (born 15 June 2000) is a Belgian singer and footballer, who rose to fame after winning The Voice Belgique 2021. He represented  at the Eurovision Song Contest 2022 with the song "Miss You".

Early life 
Makiese was born in Antwerp to Congolese parents. At 6 years old he and his family (including his three brothers and sister) moved to Sint-Agatha-Berchem, then to Dilbeek a few years later, spending his childhood between the two municipalities, where he learned to speak both Dutch and French. They finally settled in Uccle.

Makiese took up singing from both of his parents (his mother also playing the tam-tam), starting in a church choir at a young age and later moving on to singing lessons at school, where he took part in, and won, a contest.

Musical career

2021: The Voice Belgique 
Makiese auditioned for season nine of The Voice Belgique performing Labrinth's "Jealous", with all four coaches turning for him. He chose to join Beverly Jo Scott's team. In April 2021, he won the show.

2022: Eurovision Song Contest 
On 15 September 2021, broadcaster  (RTBF) announced that they had internally selected Makiese to represent Belgium in the Eurovision Song Contest 2022 in Turin, Italy.

Artistry

Influences 
Makiese cited Michael Jackson, Otis Redding, Gregory Porter, James Brown, Bill Withers and Aretha Franklin among his inspirations, as well as Damso and Stromae.

Personal life and other activities 
Makiese has reportedly always had an interest in football: at the age of 13, he started to play as a goalkeeper for BX Brussels. In September 2021, he signed a one-year contract with Excelsior Virton, after playing with Jeunesse Molenbeek, Royal Wallonia Walhain, and briefly with La Louvière Centre in summer 2021.

Following his success at The Voice Belgique, Makiese took a break from his higher studies in geology to focus on his singing and sports careers.

Discography

Singles

References 

Eurovision Song Contest entrants of 2022
21st-century Belgian male singers
21st-century Belgian singers
Eurovision Song Contest entrants for Belgium
The Voice (franchise) winners
Belgian footballers
Association football goalkeepers
2000 births
Musicians from Brussels
Living people
Belgian people of Democratic Republic of the Congo descent